Gumerovo (Ğümär) is a rural locality (a village) in Ishimbaysky District of the Republic of Bashkortostan, Russia.

References

Rural localities in Ishimbaysky District
Ishimbaysky District